In petroleum engineering, TEM (true effective mobility), also called TEM-function developed by Abouzar Mirzaei-Paiaman, is a criterion to characterize dynamic two-phase flow characteristics of rocks (or dynamic rock quality). TEM is a function of relative permeability, porosity, absolute permeability and fluid viscosity, and can be determined for each fluid phase separately. TEM-function has been derived from Darcy's law for multiphase flow.

Rocks with better fluid dynamics (i.e., experiencing a lower pressure drop in conducting a fluid phase) have higher TEM versus saturation curves. Rocks with lower TEM versus saturation curves resemble low quality systems.

TEM-function in analyzing relative permeability data is analogous with Leverett J-function in analyzing capillary pressure data. Furthermore, TEM-function in two-phase flow systems is an extension of RQI (rock quality index) for single-phase systems.

Also, TEM-function can be used for averaging relative permeability curves (for each fluid phase separately, i.e., water, oil, gas).

See also
 Lak wettability index
 USBM wettability index

References 

Petroleum engineering